Thamewali is a historic town and union council of Mianwali District in the Punjab province of Pakistan.

History 
The town's history dates back to the resides of the caravans of the Muslim warrior Sher Shah Suri in his war times, It is said by locals that the high altitude of Thamewali was favorable to keep an eye on enemy during stay. The central town is circled by diminishing graveyard, hinting the wars. Later on before the partition of India and Pakistan, Hindus ruled the area and built a small fort at the top of the hill in center of Thamewali, which still exists. There is a place called Hindu Graveyard at east side of the town too. After the partition Hindus left the area and moved to India, handing over all the agricultural land to their that time friends called Malak, including the fort. Current political leaders of Thamewali are the successor of the partition time Maliks, occupying the fort personally and most of the agriculture land around Thamewali. In 2009, Pakistan Army has started occupying the area in mountains to build a nuclear storage, after which area has started seeing new developments like roads.

Geography
Thamewali has salt range mountains on the west or back side of the village. A fort at the peak of the mountain, built 100 years back in early 1900 by Hindus. The current existing town was built before Pakistan's independence. There are green fields on the east side of town.

References 

Union councils of Mianwali District
Populated places in Mianwali District